Frederick Justin Almgren Jr. (July 3, 1933, in Birmingham, Alabama – February 5, 1997, in Princeton, New Jersey) was an American mathematician working in geometric measure theory.

He received a Guggenheim Fellowship in 1974.  Between 1963 and 1992 he was a frequent visiting scholar at the Institute for Advanced Study in Princeton.

He wrote one of the longest papers in mathematics, proving what is now called the Almgren regularity theorem: the singular set of an m-dimensional mass-minimizing surface has dimension at most m−2. He played also an important role in the founding of The Geometry Center.

He was a student of Herbert Federer, one of the founders of geometric measure theory, and was the advisor and husband (as his second wife) of Jean Taylor.
His daughter, Ann S. Almgren, is an applied mathematician who works on computational simulations in astrophysics. His son, Robert F. Almgren, is an applied mathematician working on market microstructure and trade execution.

Selected publications
. A set of mimeographed notes in which Frederick J. Almgren Jr. introduces the term "varifold" for the first time. 
. The first widely circulated book describing the concept of a varifold and its applications to the Plateau's problem.
.
.
. The second edition of the book .

Notes

References

Biographical references
.
.
.

General references
.
.
.
.

Scientific references
.
.

See also
Almgren regularity theorem
Almgren–Pitts min-max theory
Almgren Isomorphism Theorem

External links

1933 births
1997 deaths
20th-century American mathematicians
Institute for Advanced Study visiting scholars
Princeton University faculty
Mathematicians from Alabama